Bergmann is a German or Swedish surname. It means "mountain man" in both languages, as well as "miner" in German. 
Bergman is also a common surname in the United States, Sweden, Germany and the Netherlands.

The surname may refer to:
Art Bergmann (born 1953), Canadian rock singer-songwriter
Carl Bergmann, (1814–1865) German anatomist, physiologist and biologist who developed the Bergmann's rule
Carl Bergmann (1821–1876), German-American cellist and conductor
Carl Bergmann (1874–1935), German secretary of state
Daniel Bergmann (born 1962), Czech filmmaker and media mogul (son of Pavel)
Eirikur Bergmann (born 1969), Icelandic writer and professor of political science 
Ernst Bergmann (1881–1945), German philosopher and proponent of Nazism
Ernst David Bergmann (1903–1975), Israeli nuclear scientist and chemist who found a nuclear program (brother of Theodor, the agronomist)
Ernst von Bergmann (1836–1907), Baltic German surgeon who introduced principles of aseptic surgery

Frithjof Bergmann (1930–2021), German philosophy professor
Gretel Bergmann (1914–2017), Jewish athlete who competed as a high jumper in Germany during the 1930s
Heinrich Bergmann (?–?), head of the Criminal Division of the German Kripo in German-occupied Estonia
Franz Xaver Bergmann (1861–1936), Austrian foundry owner
Hugo Bergmann (1883–1975), German-Israeli Jewish philosopher (father of Martin S.)
Gustav Bergmann (1906–1987), Austrian-born American philosopher
Jason Bergmann (born 1981), American baseball player
Júlia Bergmann (born 2001), German-Brazilian volleyball player
Juliette Bergmann (born 1958), Dutch bodybuilder
Martin S. Bergmann (1913–2014), American psychoanalyst (son of Hugo)
Michael Bergmann, American filmmaker (grandson of Hugo)
Pavel Bergmann (1930–2005), Czech philosopher & historian, signatory of Charter 77 (father of Daniel and nephew of Hugo)
Peter Bergmann (?–2009), alias used by an unidentified German-speaking man who died under mysterious circumstances
Peter Gabriel Bergmann (1915–2002), German-American physicist
Ralph Bergmann (born 1970), German volleyball player
Sabine Bergmann-Pohl (born 1946), German conservative politician who served as the last head of state of the German Democratic Republic
Stefan Bergmann (1895–1977), mathematician 
Thaisa Storchi Bergmann (born 1955), leading Brazilian astrophysicist
Theodor Bergmann (1850–1931), German businessman and industrialist
Theodor Bergmann (1916–2017), German agronomist and published author (brother of Ernst David)
Theodor Bergmann (born 1996), German footballer
Walter Bergmann (1902–1988), German composer and musician

See also
Bergman
Bergemann
Bergman (disambiguation)
Bergmans

German-language surnames
Swedish-language surnames
Jewish surnames
Occupational surnames
Russian Mennonite surnames